The 2022 COSAFA U-17 Women's Championship was the 4th edition of the COSAFA U-17 Women's Championship an international association football competition for women's under-17 national teams organized by Council of Southern Africa Football Associations (COSAFA). The tournament took place in Lilongwe, Malawi from 1 to 11 December 2022.

Zambia was the defending champion having defeated Botswana four to nil in the final on 6 December 2021.

South Africa won their maiden title after beating Zambia four goals to three. Malawi the Host clinched the bronze medal after crashing Botswana nine goals to nil on third-place match.

Participating nations
Six teams from the COSAFA region entered the tournament, originally Mauritius entered the tournament and were drawn in group A, however they withdrew before the tournament started, which saw Namibia taking their place. Malawi participated for the first time in the COSAFA U-17 Women's Championship history.

Venue
All matches were played at these ground in Malawi.

Draw
The draw for the tournament were held on 4 November 2022 at Lilongwe, Malawi. The six teams were divided into two group. Top two teams from each group will enter to the Semi-finals

Group summary

Group stages

Group A
<onlyinclude>

Group B
<onlyinclude>

Knockout stage
In the knockout stage, extra-time and a penalty shoot-out will be used to decide the winner if necessary.

Bracket

Semi-finals

Third place match

Final

Awards

Goalscorers

References

COSAFA Under-17 Championship
2022 in African football
International association football competitions hosted by South Africa
COSAFA Women's U17